{{DISPLAYTITLE:Fσ set}}
In mathematics, an Fσ set (said F-sigma set)  is a countable union of closed sets.

The complement of an Fσ set is a Gδ set.

Examples 

Each closed set is an Fσ set.

More generally, any countable set in a T1 space is an Fσ set, because every singleton  is closed.

The set  of irrationals is not a Fσ set.

In metrizable spaces, every open set is an Fσ set. 

The union of countably many Fσ sets is an Fσ set, and the intersection of finitely many Fσ sets is an Fσ set.

The set  of all points  in the Cartesian plane such that  is rational is an Fσ set because it can be expressed as the union of all the lines passing through the origin with rational slope:

where , is the set of rational numbers, which is a countable set.

See also
Gδ set — the dual notion.
Borel hierarchy
 P-space, any space having the property that every Fσ set is closed

References

Topology
Descriptive set theory